Pari Pari Matua Parkinson (born 12 September 1996) is a New Zealand rugby union player who plays for  in the Bunnings NPC and the  in Super Rugby.  His position of choice is Lock.

School and domestic rugby career 
Parkinson was educated at Saint Kentigern College in Auckland, before relocating to Nelson to join the Crusaders Academy and play for club team Stoke. He had an early taste of Super Rugby when he played four minutes for the Crusaders top side in a practice match against the Highlanders in Oamaru in 2016, at 19 years of age. Parkison joined the Tasman Mako wider training group in 2016, having previously represented the New Zealand Barbarians Schools side. He made two appearances for Tasman in the 2016 Mitre 10 Cup and was named in their squad for the 2017 Mitre 10 Cup.

Parkinson was part of the  team that won the 2019 Mitre 10 Cup for the first time.

In 2020, Parkinson established himself as first choice lock for the Highlanders, during the Super Rugby Aotearoa competition, drawing praise for his performances and work rate.

Parkinson missed the 2020 Mitre 10 Cup with injury as the Mako went on to win their second premiership title in a row.

In Round 10 of the 2021 Bunnings NPC Parkinson suffered yet another injury while playing for Tasman against , ruling him out for the entire 2022 season.

Māori All Blacks 
In 2018, Parkinson was selected for the Māori All Blacks tour of the US, Chile and Brazil, thus following in the footsteps of his uncle Matua Parkinson, who played for the side and also captained the New Zealand Sevens team. During the tour, he started all three games at 5 in what was a clean sweep, however, he was yellow carded in the match against the USA for a body slam on Eagles number 9 Shaun Davies.

Parkinson represents his iwi Te Whānau-ā-Apanui, from the eastern Bay of Plenty and East Coast regions of New Zealand's North Island.

About his involvement in the Māori All Blacks, Parkinson said: "It was the icing on the cake of a pretty awesome Mitre 10 season"  He also cited Chile as his favourite destination on the tour, because of the weather, the people and the training facilities, while also saying to be proud to be contributing to growing the sport around the world.

Parkinson was named in the Māori All Blacks squad again in 2021 after missing out on the 2020 squad due to injury.

Style of play 
From the position of lock, Parkinson stands out in the lineout and for his work around the park, using his big frame to carry the ball into defenders and setting teammates with his offloads. His dimensions made his Highlanders captain Ash Dixon label him as a "baby giraffe".

References

External links

1996 births
Living people
Highlanders (rugby union) players
Māori All Blacks players
New Zealand Māori rugby union players
New Zealand rugby union players
Rugby union locks
Rugby union players from Whakatāne
Tasman rugby union players